

Season headlines 
 Blocked shots and steals both became official statistics tracked by the NCAA. David Robinson of Navy became the first national blocked shot champion, averaging 5.91 per game for the season. The first steals champion was Darron Brittman of Chicago State, with 4.96 per game.

Major rule changes 
Beginning in 1985–86, the following rules changes were implemented:
 The 45 second shot clock was introduced.
 With the shot clock's introduction, the so-called "lack of action" count (when the offense fails to attempt a shot in a five-second timeframe) was abolished.
 If a shooter was fouled intentionally and the shot was missed, the penalty was two shots and possession of the ball out of bounds to the team who was fouled.
 Conferences were permitted to experiment with a three-point field goal, provided the distance was set to at least 19 feet, 9 inches from the center of the basket.

Season outlook

Pre-season polls 
The top 20 from the AP Poll during the pre-season.

Regular season

Conference winners and tournaments

Statistical leaders

Conference standings

Postseason tournaments

NCAA tournament

Final Four - Reunion Arena, Dallas, Texas

National Invitation tournament

NIT Semifinals and Final 
Played at Madison Square Garden in New York City

 Third Place - Louisiana Tech 67, Florida 62

Award winners

Consensus All-American teams

Major player of the year awards 

 Wooden Award: Walter Berry, St. John's
 Naismith Award: Johnny Dawkins, Duke
 Associated Press Player of the Year: Walter Berry, St. John's
 UPI Player of the Year: Walter Berry, St. John's
 NABC Player of the Year: Walter Berry, St. John's
 Oscar Robertson Trophy (USBWA): Walter Berry, St. John's
 Adolph Rupp Trophy: Walter Berry, St. John's
 Sporting News Player of the Year: Walter Berry, St. John's

Major coach of the year awards 
 Associated Press Coach of the Year: Eddie Sutton, Kentucky
 UPI Coach of the Year: Mike Krzyzewski, Duke
 Henry Iba Award (USBWA): Dick Versace, Bradley
 NABC Coach of the Year: Eddie Sutton, Kentucky
 CBS/Chevrolet Coach of the Year: Mike Krzyzewski, Duke
 Sporting News Coach of the Year: Denny Crum, Louisville

Other major awards 
 Frances Pomeroy Naismith Award (Best player under 6'0): Jim Les, Bradley
 Robert V. Geasey Trophy (Top player in Philadelphia Big 5): Harold Pressley, Villanova
 NIT/Haggerty Award (Top player in New York City metro area): Walter Berry, St. John's

Coaching changes 

A number of teams changed coaches during the season and after it ended.

References